Svetislav Mandić (8 March 1921 – 4 October 2003) was a Yugoslav and Serbian historian, copier, fresco conserver, poet and painter.

Life
He was born on March 8, 1921, in Mostar, Kingdom of Yugoslavia (now Bosnia and Herzegovina). He finished the gymnasium in his town in 1939, and then finished the Academy of Fine Arts in capital Belgrade in 1950. He started with poetry in his gymnasium days, and as a student published poems in various papers and newspapers. In his adult years he began his work on cultural monuments of the history of the Serbs and he published many works on that theme, due to which he was awarded the Order of St. Sava class I.

Books
"Dvojica", pesme (zajedno sa Velimirom Kovačevićem, Mostar 1940),
"Kad mlidijah živeti", mladalačka elegija ("Novo pokolenje", Beograd 1952),
"Milosno doba", pesme ("Prosveta", Beograd 1960),
"The Virgin's Church at Studenica" (1966)
"Drevnik", zapisi konzervatora ("Slovo ljubve", Beograd 1975),
"Crte i reze", fragmenti starog imenika ("Slovo ljubve", Beograd 1981),
"Rozeta na Resavi", pletenije slovesa o Ravanici i Manasiji ("Bagdala", Kruševac 1986),
"Velika gospoda sve srpske zemlje" i drugi prosopografski prilozi ("Srpska književna zadruga", Beograd 1986),
"Carski čin Stefana Nemanje", činjenice i pretpostavke o srpskom srednjovekovlju ("Srpska književna zadruga", Beograd 1990),
"Pesme", izbor ("Veselin Maslesa", Sarajevo 1990),
"Zvezdara i druge pesme", ("Srpska književna zadruga", Beograd 1995),

External links
 Translated works by Svetislav Mandić

References
 

1921 births
2003 deaths
20th-century Serbian painters
20th-century Serbian poets
20th-century Serbian historians
Serbian male poets
Bosnia and Herzegovina painters
Bosnia and Herzegovina poets
Yugoslav historians
Yugoslav painters
Yugoslav poets
Serbs of Bosnia and Herzegovina
Writers from Mostar
University of Arts in Belgrade alumni
Artists from Mostar
Serbian male painters
20th-century Serbian male artists